

Buildings and structures

Buildings

 1630s – Tomb of Ali Mardan Khan in Lahore is built.
 1630–1631 – Church of San Caio in Rome rebuilt by Francesco Peparelli and Vincenzo della Greca.
 1630–1635 – The Pearl Mosque at Lahore Fort is built.
 1631 – Work starts on the basilica of Santa Maria della Salute in Venice, designed by Baldassare Longhena.
 1632
 College chapel of Peterhouse, Cambridge, England, is consecrated.
 Work starts on the Taj Mahal, probably designed by Ustad Ahmad Lahauri.
 1633
 Completion of the Palazzo Barberini in Rome by Gian Lorenzo Bernini (begun 1627 by Maderno).
 Reconstruction of the Great Synagogue of Vilna completed.
 Completion of St Columb's Cathedral, Derry, Ireland, designed by William Parrott, the first post-Reformation Anglican cathedral built in the British Isles and the first Protestant cathedral built in Europe.
 St Paul's, Covent Garden, designed by Inigo Jones, opened to worship, the first wholly new church built in London since the English Reformation.
 Kiyomizu-dera Buddhist temple in eastern Kyoto, Japan, built.
 Grange Court in Leominster, England, built by John Abel.
 1634–1635 – House for Constantijn Huygens on the Binnenhof in The Hague (Dutch Republic), designed by Jacob van Campen with the client, is built.
 1635 
 Canterbury Quadrangle at St John's College, Oxford, England, the first example of Italian Renaissance architecture in the city, is completed.
 The Radziwiłł Palace, Vilnius, is begun.

 1635–1636 – Yerevan Kiosk (Revan Köşkü), designed by Architect Kasemi, in the Topkapı Palace, Istanbul, is built.
 1636
 Completion of Sher-Dor Madrasah in Samarkand (begun 1619).
 Construction of Pont Fawr bridge at Llanrwst in Wales.
 Construction of the Floriana Lines around Floriana on Malta, designed by Pietro Paolo Floriani, is begun.
 1637 – Almshouses at Moretonhampstead, England, built in surviving form.
 1638
 May 13 – Construction begins on the Red Fort in Delhi for Mughal Emperor Shah Jahan.
 November 7 – The Mariensäule Marian column in Marienplatz in Munich, the first one north of the Alps, is completed.
 The Queen's House at Greenwich in England, designed by Inigo Jones in 1616 as the first major example of classical architecture in the country, is completed.
 1638–1639 – Baghdad Kiosk (Bağdat Köşkü), designed by Architect Kasemi, in the Topkapı Palace, Istanbul, is built.

Births
 1630
 April 16 – Lambert van Haven, Danish architect (died 1695)
 September 13 – Olaus Rudbeck, Swedish architect (died 1702)
 1632
 July 3 – Tylman van Gameren, Dutch architect (died 1706)
 October 20 – Christopher Wren, English scientist and architect (died 1723)
 Lady Elizabeth Wilbraham, née Mytton, English amateur architect (died 1705)
 1633 – Robert Mylne Scottish stonemason and architect (died 1710)
 1634 – Francesco Ferrari, Italian Baroque painter and architect (died 1708)
 1635: July 18 – Robert Hooke, English scientist and architect (died 1703)
 1638: September 20 – Antonio Gherardi, Italian Baroque painter, sculptor and architect (died 1702)
 1639 – Lorenzo Gafà, Maltese Baroque architect and sculptor (died 1703)

Deaths
 1632: October 23 – Giovanni Battista Crespi, Italian painter, sculpture and architect (born 1573)
 1635
 Giovanni Battista Crescenzi, Italian-born Baroque painter and architect (born 1577)
 Giulio Parigi, Italian architect and designer (born 1571)
 1636 – Giovanni Attard, Maltese architect, military engineer and stone carver (born c. 1570)
 1637 – Arent Passer, Dutch-born stonemason and architect working in Finland under Swedish rule (born c. 1560)
 1638: May 27 – Pietro Paolo Floriani, Italian architect and engineer (born 1585)
 1639: August 6 – Hans van Steenwinckel the Younger, Flemish/Danish architect (born 1587)

References

Architecture